Uummannaq is a town in the Avannaata municipality, in central-western Greenland. With 1,407 inhabitants in 2020, it is the eighth-largest town in Greenland, and is home to the country's most northerly ferry terminal. Founded in 1763 as Omenak, the town is a hunting and fishing base, with a canning factory and a marble quarry. In 1932, the Universal Greenland-Filmexpedition with director Arnold Fanck released the film S.O.S. Eisberg near Uummannaq.

Geography

Uummannaq is located 590 kilometres north of the Arctic Circle on Uummannaq Island located in the south-central arm of the  Uummannaq Fjord. Uummannaq is also the general name given to the series of inlets north of the promontory at Niaqornat on the Nuussuaq Peninsula.

Uummannaq Mountain

The island is also home to Uummannaq Mountain, rising very sharply to the height of 1170m. Climbing it requires technical skills.

Transport
Air Greenland operates helicopter services to Qaarsut Airport from Uummannaq Heliport. The neighbouring villages in the Uummannaq area are served by district cargo helicopters. In summer months, Royal Arctic Line operates its 'bygdeservice' with sailings by small ships to its neighbouring villages, including a service to Qaarsut.

Climate

Uummannaq has a tundra climate with short, cold summers and long, very cold winters.

Culture 

Danish and Greenlandic children are told that Santa Claus lives in Spraglebugten Bay in the west of the island. A turf hut (Santa's Castle) was built there for a Danish television programme and remains Santa's home in the popular imagination.

Scottish singer KT Tunstall's third album Tiger Suit features the track "Uummannaq Song", which was inspired by her trip to the town in September 2008 with Cape Farewell.

Uummannaq is home to Uummannaq Music – the world's northernmost music platform on sea ice.

Notable People
 Ole Jørgen Hammeken, polar explorer
 Siissisoq, a Greenlandic rock band
 Nukaaka Coster-Waldau, actress, singer, former Miss Greenland and wife of Danish actor Nikolaj Coster-Waldau
 Aleqa Hammond, former Prime Minister of Greenland, and first female Prime Minister, grew up in Uummannaq
 Pipaluk Freuchen, children's writer

Population
Uummannaq is the second-largest town in the Avannaata municipality. It had 1,407 inhabitants in 2020, which was a decrease of more than 12% relative to the population in 2000.

References

External links
  Villages in the Uummannaq area
 Photos of Uummannaq
 About filming in Greenland in 1933

 
Populated places in Greenland
Populated places of Arctic Greenland
Populated places established in 1763
Avannaata
1763 establishments in North America
18th-century establishments in Greenland